Bârzeşti may refer to several villages in Romania:

 Bârzeşti, a village in Archiș Commune, Arad County
 Bârzeşti, a village in Vulturești, Argeș
 Bârzeşti, a village in Ștefan cel Mare, Vaslui
 Bârzeşti, a village in Bărbătești, Vâlcea